The River Rye in the English county of North Yorkshire rises just south of the Cleveland Hills, east of Osmotherley, and flows through Hawnby, Rievaulx, Helmsley, Nunnington, West and East Ness, Butterwick, Brawby, and Ryton, before joining the River Derwent at  near Malton.

The river valley (dale) gave its name to the Ryedale shire district, which extends southwest into the Vale of Pickering along the River Derwent.

Course

The river rises at Rye Head near Snilesworth Lodge on Snilesworth Moor in the Cleveland Hills and collects the River Seph which flows along Bilsdale. It passes Rievaulx Abbey and enters the Vale of Pickering at Helmsley. In its eastward course from Helmsley, the Rye receives the River Dove from Farndale which has previously added the Hodge Beck from Bransdale. Hodge Beck is partly swallowed by the limestone aquifer in Kirkdale and issues again further down the valley. Kirkbymoorside is on the River Dove which, like Hodge Beck has a partly subterranean course. Rosedale sends down the River Seven which comes by Sinnington to join the Rye. The steep-sided Newtondale gives Pickering Beck which joins the Costa Beck before it enters the River Rye just before its mouth into River Derwent.

Areas
For management purposes the River Rye is divided into two units, Ness and Howe Bridge.

Ness
It covers the River Rye and its tributaries from its source to its confluence with the River Dove near the village of East Ness.

The Ness area is mainly rural with dispersed settlements. Here the land use is largely managed grassland. In the lower part, land use is a mixture of managed grassland and arable farming with pockets of forestry and woodland close to the river.

Abstraction from the river is mainly to supply a fish farm at Harome and this water is returned to the river. Wastewater treatment works have been built at Helmsley and Sproxton. The ecology and fisheries are highly sensitive to changers in water flow.

Howe Bridge
It covers the River Rye from East Ness to its confluence with the River Derwent just beyond Howe Bridge. In this area the main tributaries are the River Riccal, River Dove (with Hodge Beck), River Seven, Costa Beck and Pickering Beck.

The market towns of Pickering and Kirkbymoorside are the largest settlements. Otherwise the area is rural with a varied topography. To the north is the upland moorland of the North York moors with the valleys of Bransdale, Farndale, Rosedale and Newtondale. To the south the tributaries from the valleys converge and the land becomes flatter. To the south-west the Howe Bridge area covers the undulating landscape of the Howardian Hills.

The largest abstractions are for fish farming. Wastewater treatment works are at Pickering, Harome and Kirkbymoorside.

Geology
At source the River Rye and its tributaries run over Corallian limestone which outcrops on the hills surrounding the Vale of Pickering. In places the major aquifer is exposed in the river bed and river water is lost through swallow holes at Kirkdale and Kirkby Mills. Beneath the course of the Rye and its tributaries in the Vale of Pickering lie the lacustrine deposits from the last ice age. Newtondale was a melt water channel draining the North York Moors at the end of the ice age and its valley is much more deeply incised than the flow of the present Pickering Beck would suggest.

History

The upland streams of the Rye and its tributaries have powered water mills for centuries. There were three mills at Pickering and others at Kirkby Mills, near Kirkbymoorside. A mill at Bransdale is owned by the National Trust, though not open to visitors.
Rievaulx Abbey was established on the banks of the Rye on land given by Walter l'Espec of Helmsley and took its name from a literal translation of Rye Valley from the French. The monks of Rievaulx diverted the river away from the abbey buildings.

On the Costa Beck south of Pickering traces of a prehistoric settlement were excavated in the late-19th century.

Economy
The main economic value of the River Rye lies in its use as a water source for agriculture, domestic supply, fisheries and leisure pursuits. It also drains the water discharged by wastewater treatment works.

Nature protection

There are many sites in the Rye catchment area which have designated status.

North York Moors are designated as a Special Protection Area, providing protection to birds, their nests, eggs and habitats and a Special Area of Conservation, contributug to biodiversity by maintaining and restoring habitats and species other than birds.

Sites of Special Scientific Interest in the area include Farndale; Cropton Banks and Howlgate Head Woods; Newton Dale; The Ings of Amotherby;  Duncombe Park; Ashberry and Reins Woods; Rievaulx Woods; Ryedale Windy Pits and North York Moors.

Duncombe Park is a National Nature Reserve (NNR), while the Howardian Hills are an Area of Outstanding Natural Beauty.

References

Rivers of North Yorkshire
2Rye